Razdolye is a rural locality (a selo) in Medvezhenskoye Rural Settlement, Semiluksky District, Voronezh Oblast, Russia. The population was 64 as of 2010. There are 3 streets.

Geography 
Razdolye is located on the right bank of the Treshchevka River, 17 km north of Semiluki (the district's administrative centre) by road. Privolye is the nearest rural locality.

References 

Rural localities in Semiluksky District